Scanian Dragoon Regiment may refer to:

Scanian Dragoon Regiment (cavalry), Swedish Army cavalry regiment (1676–1928)
Scanian Dragoon Regiment (armoured), Swedish Army armoured regiment (1963–1994)